The 3rd Army was an army level command of the German Army in World War I.  It was formed on mobilization in August 1914 seemingly from the II Army Inspectorate.  The army was disbanded in 1919 during demobilization after the war.

History 
Upon the mobilization Max von Hausen (Saxon War Minister) was given command of the 3rd Army which mainly consisted of Saxons. The army participated in the Battle of the Frontiers, mainly in the Battle of Dinant and the Battle of Charleroi and the army were responsible for the destruction of Reims in September 1914. When the 2nd Army retreated after the First Battle of the Marne, Hausen saw his flank exposed and ordered a retreat. Upon the stabilization of the front on the river Aisne, Hausen was relieved of his command and replaced by General Karl von Einem.

Einem's right flank units participate in the Champagne-Marne offensive on 15–17 July 1918 supporting the east flank of the 1st Army.

Order of Battle, 30 October 1918

Commanders 
The 3rd Army had the following commanders during its existence:

Glossary 
  (Army Detachment) in the sense of "something detached from an army".  It is not under the command of an army being a small army.
  (Army Group) a group within an army and under its command, generally formed as a temporary measure for a task.
  (Army Group) several armies under a commander.

See also 

 3rd Army (Wehrmacht) for the equivalent formation in World War II
 German Army order of battle (1914)
 German Army order of battle, Western Front (1918)
 Schlieffen Plan

References

Bibliography 
 
 

03
Military units and formations established in 1914
Military units and formations disestablished in 1919